Maniac Nurses Find Ecstasy (also known as Bloodsucking Freaks II) is a 1990 Belgium/Hungarian erotic horror film written, directed, and produced by Léon Paul De Bruyn (under the pseudonym "Harry M. Love") and distributed by Troma Entertainment.

Plot
A group of lesbian nurses who lure unsuspecting male strangers back to their home to torture them.

Production
Maniac Nurses was billed as a sequel to the 1976 exploitation film Bloodsucking Freaks, also distributed by Troma, but has no connection to it whatsoever.

References

External links
 

1990 films
1990 horror films
Hungarian independent films
Troma Entertainment films
Belgian horror films
Belgian independent films
American independent films
Hungarian horror films
American comedy horror films
American erotic horror films
English-language Belgian films
English-language Hungarian films
1990s English-language films
1990s American films